Petra Mavis Markham (born 17 March 1944 in Prestbury, Cheshire) is a British theatre, television and film actress. She is a daughter of actor David Markham and writer Olive Dehn (1914–2007). She has three sisters: actress Kika Markham, Sonia Markham, and Jehane Markham.

Filmography 
 The Deadly Affair (1966) – Daughter at Theatre
 Fragment of Fear (1970) – Schoolgirl
 Sunday Bloody Sunday (1971) – Designer's Girlfriend
 Get Carter (1971) – Doreen Carter
 The Raging Moon (1971) – Mary
 The Hireling (1973) – Edith
 Out of Depth (2000) – Edna Walker
 Lady Godiva (2008) – Jemima's Mother (Pink Dragon)
 Back to the Garden (2013) – Penny

Television appearances
 Z-Cars episode "First Foot" (1964) – Elizabeth Cooper
 The Children of the New Forest (1964) – Alice Beverley
 Doctor Who serial The Crusade (1965) – Safiya
 Armchair Theatre episode "Barrett Keller: His Mark" (1966) – Dinky
 Shotgun (1966) – Vicky
 The Wednesday Play episode "Ape and Essence" (1966) – Loola
 Thirty-Minute Theatre episode "Not Just For An Hour" (1966) – René
 Who Is Sylvia? (1967)
 Play of the Month episode "Girls in Uniform" (1967) – Edelgard
 Softly, Softly episode "An Eye for an Eye" (1967) – Marie Berry
 Z Cars episodes "Vigilance: Part 1" and "Vigilance: Part 2" (1968) – Jill Scanlon
 Curry and Chips episode No.1.2 (1969) – Norman's daughter
 Detective episode "Hunt the Peacock" (1969) – Renee
 The First Lady episode "A Banner with a Strange Device" (1969)
 Ryan International episode "Pirouette" (1970)
 Albert and Victoria (1970) – Lydia Hackett
 Follyfoot episode "The Standstill Horse" (1971) – Ginny Tuckwood
 Thirty-Minute Theatre episode "Something for the Children" (1971) – Girlie
 Ace of Wands 20 episodes (1972) – Mikki Diamond
 Public Eye episode "The Trouble with Jenny" (1973) – Jenny Wellard
 Thriller episode "A Killer in Every Corner" (1974) – Helga
 Ripping Yarns episode "The Testing of Eric Olthwaite" (1977) – Enid Bag
 After Julius (1978)
 Angels episodes No.9.12, No.9.22 and No.9.24 (1983) – Felicity
 Bergerac episode "Sins of the Fathers" (1985) – Suzie Borden
 Love's Labour's Lost (1985) – Katharine
 Aliens in the Family (1987) – Pet
 The Bill episode "Tourist Trap" (1989) – Mrs. Belcham
 The Ruth Rendell Mysteries episode "Some Lie and Some Die" (1990) – hotel receptionist
 EastEnders 13 episodes (1993) – Rose Chapman
 Peak Practice episode "Coming Out" (1995) – Cissy Banks
 Rich Deceiver (1995) – Bella Beasley
 Plotlands (1997) – Grace Foster
 Doctors episode "Post Mortem" (2007) – Penny Cable

References

External links 

1944 births
Living people
20th-century English actresses
21st-century English actresses
English film actresses
English television actresses
People from Prestbury, Cheshire
Actresses from Cheshire